Front Desk is a middle grade book written by Kelly Yang and published by Scholastic in 2018. Yang's debut book is about ten-year-old Mia Tang and her family who, after a couple years struggling financially, are hired to manage a motel. It is the first book in the 4-part series.

Reception 
Front Desk received starred reviews from the School Library Journal and Kirkus Reviews. Katya Schapiro, who reviewed for the SLJ, commented on the "light, positive tone" Yang maintains in the book about the heavy themes, as well as the "satisfying dose of wish fulfillment that closes the story". Schapiro praised Mia's character, calling her "an irresistible protagonist," and said "many young readers will see themselves in Mia and her friends." Kirkus Reviews called the main character "a feisty and empowered heroine", and also praised the supporting characters that help "reveal life in America in the 1990s for persons of color and those living in poverty."

Writing for The Horn Book, Roxanne Hsu Feldman says "[r]eaders will admire Mia for her audacity and her creativity in finding solutions for seemingly insurmountable situations." Feldman also notes how despite the story being set in 1990s United States is still "relevant to 2018 America." In a review by Publishers Weekly, Front Desks story is called "one of indefatigable hope and of triumph over injustice, and [Mia's] voice is genuine and inspiring."

The book was awarded the 2019 Asian/Pacific American Award for Literature in the "Children's Literature" category.

Challenges 
During the Banned Books Week of 2021, Front Desk was temporarily banned in the Plainedge Union Free School District, New York. According to Yang, a parent wrote a letter saying the book was being used to teach critical race theory to the students, as well as portraying police officers as racists. The book was not removed from the school's library, and was allowed again to be used for read aloud, but parents were given the possibility to opt-out their children from reading Front Desk.

This was the second time the book was challenged, as it had previously been present in a list of banned books of the Central York High School alongside more than 300 other "anti-racist resources". This first ban was reversed in September 2021, almost an year after it begun.

References 

2018 children's books
Children's books about race and ethnicity
Debut books
Scholastic Corporation books
Teen fiction